The 2009 Kerrick Sports Sedan Series was an Australian motor sport competition which began on 25 April 2009 at Wakefield Park and ended on 22 November at Phillip Island Grand Prix Circuit after five rounds and fifteen races. The series was open to Group 3D Sports Sedans, Tran-Am automobles and New Zealand TraNZam automobiles. It marked the 19th running of a national series for Sports Sedans in Australia.

Chevrolet Corvette driver Des Wall won the series after a fierce contest between the top three competitors. Winners of the previous two series, Tony Ricciardello (Alfa Romeo Alfetta) and Darren Hossack (Audi A4), competed initially for the race wins, but mechanical unreliability and on-track confrontations, usually with each other, allowed Wall to close the gap. Wall only won three races (compared to Ricciardello's six and Hossack's five) but was only out of the top five race positions once all season with an eighth-placed finish at Oran Park. Ricciardello and Hossack each failed to finish two races during the series. Wall, who has been a Sports Sedan front runner since 1989, claimed his first series win with a twelve-point victory over Ricciardello. Hossack was third, nine points behind Ricciardello.

The only other driver to score a race win was Opel Calibra driver Chris Jackson at Oran Park and he finished fifth in the points chase behind series veteran Kerry Baily (Nissan 300ZX).

Teams and drivers

The following drivers competed in the 2009 Kerrick Sports Sedan Series. The series consisted of fifteen races, at five race meetings, held in three states.

Results and standings

Race calendar
The 2009 Kerrick Sports Sedan Series consisted of five rounds, three of which were held at Shannons Nationals Motor Racing Championships meetings and two at other meetings.

Note: The Clem Smith Cup was awarded to the winner of Race 2 at the Mallala round.

Drivers' points 
Points were awarded 20-17-15-13-12-11-10-9-8-7-6-5-4-3-2-1 based on the top sixteen race positions in each race. There were two bonus points allocated for pole position. Pole position is indicated in bold text.

References

External links
 Official series website
 Shannons Nationals Motor Racing Championships
 2009 Racing Results Archive
 Images from Shannons Nationals; Mallala June 2009, www.flickr.com, as archived at web.archive.org

National Sports Sedan Series
Sports Sedans